Chrysomantis is a genus of praying mantis in the family Hymenopodidae. They are native to Africa and are represented by the following species:
Chrysomantis cachani
Chrysomantis congica
Chrysomantis girardi
Chrysomantis royi
Chrysomantis speciosa
Chrysomantis tessmanni

See also
List of mantis genera and species

References

 
Acromantinae
Mantodea genera
Mantodea of Africa
Fauna of Central Africa
Insects of West Africa
Taxa named by Ermanno Giglio-Tos